Minnesota State Highway 112 (MN 112) was a  highway in south-central Minnesota, which ran from its interchange with U.S. Highway 169 in the city of Le Sueur and continued south and then east to its eastern terminus at its intersection with State Highway 99 in Lexington Township near the city of Le Center.

Route description
State Highway 112 served as a north–south and an east–west route between the cities of Le Sueur and Le Center in south-central Minnesota.

Highway 112 changed direction to east–west in Ottawa Township and continued as east–west to its eastern terminus near the city limits of Le Center.

The highway was officially marked as an east–west route by its highway shields from beginning to end.

In the city of Le Sueur, Highway 112 followed Commerce Street, Main Street, Bridge Street, and Ferry Street.

The Dr. William W. Mayo House museum is located near the junction of Highways 112 and 93 in the city of Le Sueur.  It is designated as a state historic site.

The route is legally defined as Route 123 in the Minnesota Statutes. It is not marked with this number.

History
Highway 112 was authorized on April 22, 1933.

The route was paved by 1940.

A section of Main Street (present day Highway 112) in the city of Le Sueur was originally part of old U.S. Highway 169 until the new U.S. 169 bypass was constructed west of town in the early 1960s.

It was announced on April 19, 2019 that the highway was handed over to Le Sueur County. It was renamed to Le Sueur County Road 22 and reconstructed.

Major intersections

References

112
Transportation in Le Sueur County, Minnesota
U.S. Route 169